The Sandhornøy Bridge is a cantilever bridge that crosses the Tverrsundet strait between the mainland and the island of Sandhornøya in the municipality of Gildeskål in Nordland county, Norway. The Sandhornøy Bridge was opened in 1989 as an arm off of Norwegian County Road 17. The bridge is a single-cell prestressed concrete box girder bridge that was built using the balanced cantilever method.

References

External links
Photo seen from the south
Photo seen from the west

Gildeskål
Road bridges in Nordland
Bridges completed in 1989
1989 establishments in Norway